The College of Banking is a private university located in Prague, Czech Republic.

History
The College of Banking was authorized by Ministry of Education, Youth and Sports of the Czech Republic in 1999 as the first private higher education institution in the Czech Republic. In 2001, a German training company-holding company COGNOS AG, partnered with Banking Institute / College of Banking and it became the first private Czech College with a strategic foreign partner. Within the framework of its external development the college has established new regional consulting centers both in Czechia and Slovakia.

Programs of study
The study system includes three programs:
1. Bachelor Study Program available in daily and combined studies
2. Master Study Program in two branches available in the forms of daily and combined studies
3. Lifelong Learning qualification and re-qualification Programs focused on the study of Banking, Information Technologies, Property Valuation and Languages

External links
 
 COGNOS AG website

Banking schools
Educational institutions in Prague
1999 establishments in the Czech Republic
Educational institutions established in 1999